SNOC or snoc may be:
Sharjah National Oil Corporation, the National Oil Company for the Emirate of Sharjah in the United Arab Emirates
Singapore National Olympic Council, Singaporean registered society recognised by the International Olympic Committee
Seychelles National Oil Company, state-owned oil company formed in 1984
snoc, a function in computer programming for adding elements to the end of a list
Satellite network operations center, from which network monitoring and control is exercised over a satellite network
Saturday Night on Campus, a student activity at Cornerstone University, Grand Rapids, Michigan, United States
Aeroporto de Canindé de São Francisco (ICAO code SNOC), airport in Canindé de São Francisco, Sergipe, Brazil